Terrestrial animals are animals that live predominantly or entirely on land (e.g. cats, dogs, ants, spiders), as compared with aquatic animals, which live predominantly or entirely in the water (e.g. fish, lobsters, octopuses), and amphibians, which rely on a combination of aquatic and terrestrial habitats (e.g. frogs and newts). Some groups of insects are terrestrial, such as ants, butterflies, earwigs, cockroaches, grasshoppers and many others, while other groups are partially aquatic, such as mosquitoes and dragonflies, which pass their larval stages in water. Terrestrial animals tend to be more developed and intelligent than aquatic animals.

Terrestrial classes

The term "terrestrial" is typically applied to species that live primarily on the ground, in contrast to arboreal species, which live primarily in trees.

There are other less common terms that apply to specific groups of terrestrial animals:
Saxicolous creatures are rock dwelling. "Saxicolous" is derived from the Latin word saxum, meaning a rock. 
Arenicolous creatures live in the sand.
Troglofauna predominantly live in caves.

Taxonomy
Terrestrial invasion is one of the most important events in the history of life. Terrestrial lineages evolved in several animal phyla, among which arthropods, vertebrates and mollusks are representatives of more successful groups of terrestrial animals.

Terrestrial animals do not form a unified clade; rather, they share only the fact that they live on land. The transition from an aquatic to terrestrial life by various groups of animals has occurred independently and successfully many times. Most terrestrial lineages originated under a mild or tropical climate during the Paleozoic and Mesozoic, whereas few animals became fully terrestrial during the Cenozoic.

If internal parasites are excluded, free living species in terrestrial environments are represented by the following eleven phyla:

Gastrotrichs (hairy-backs) live in transient terrestrial water and go dormant during desiccation
Rotifers (wheel animals) live in transient terrestrial water and go dormant during desiccation
Nematodes (roundworms) by going dormant during desiccation
Eutardigrades (water bears) live in transient terrestrial water and go dormant during desiccation
Flatworms (land planarians) require moist habitats and have restricted range
Nemerteans (ribbon worms in Monostilifera) require moist habitats and have restricted range
Onychophora (velvet worms) require moist habitats and have restricted range, the only solely terrestrial phylum
Annelids (Clitellates) require moist habitats, highly diverse and derived from their marine relatives
Arthropods (fully terrestrial members: hexapods, arachnids, myriapods, woodlice, sandhoppers, and terrestrial crabs; semi-terrestrial members include Water Fleas, Copepods, and Seed Shrimp)
Mollusks (Gastropods: land snails and slugs)
Chordates (Tetrapods; semiterrestrial members: Amphibious fish)

Roundworms, gastrotrichs, tardigrades, rotifers and some smaller species of arthropods and annelids are microscopic animals that require a film of water to live in, and are therefore considered semi-terrestrial. Flatworms, ribbon worms, velvet worms and annelids all depend on more or less moist habitats. The three remaining phyla, arthropods, mollusks, and chordates, all contain species that have adapted totally to dry terrestrial environments, and which have no aquatic phase in their life cycles.

Difficulties

Labeling an animal species "terrestrial" or "aquatic" is often obscure and becomes a matter of judgment. Many animals considered terrestrial have a life-cycle that is partly dependent on being in water. Penguins, seals, and walruses sleep on land and feed in the ocean, yet they are all considered terrestrial. Many insects, e.g. mosquitos, and all terrestrial crabs, as well as other clades, have an aquatic life cycle stage: their eggs need to be laid in and to hatch in water; after hatching, there is an early aquatic form, either a nymph or larva.

There are crab species that are completely aquatic, crab species that are amphibious, and crab species that are terrestrial. Fiddler crabs are called "semi-terrestrial" since they make burrows in the muddy substrate, to which they retreat during high tides. When the tide is out, fiddler crabs search the beach for food. The same is true in the mollusca. Many hundreds of gastropod genera and species live in intermediate situations, such as for example, Truncatella. Some gastropods with gills live on land, and others with a lung live in the water.

As well as the purely terrestrial and the purely aquatic animals, there are many borderline species. There are no universally accepted criteria for deciding how to label these species, thus some assignments are disputed.

Terrestrial panarthropods 
Fossil evidence has shown that sea creatures, likely arthropods, first began to make forays onto land around 530 million years ago, in the Early Cambrian. There is little reason to believe, however, that animals first began living reliably on land around that time. A more likely hypothesis is that these early arthropods' motivation for venturing onto dry land was to mate (as modern horseshoe crabs do) or to lay eggs out of the reach of predators.
Three groups of arthropods had independently adapted to land by the end of the Cambrian: myriapods, hexapods and arachnids. By the late Ordovician, they may have fully terrestrialized. There are other groups of arthropods, all from malacostracan crustaceans, which independently became terrestrial at a later date: woodlice, sandhoppers, and terrestrial crabs. Additionally, the sister panarthropodan groups Onychophora (velvet worms) are also terrestrial, while the Eutardigrada are also adapted for land to some degree; both groups probably becoming so during the Early Devonian. 
Among arthropods, many microscopic crustacean groups like copepods and amphipods and seed shrimp can go dormant when dry and live in transient bodies of water.

Vertebrate terrestrialization

By approximately 375 million years ago the bony fish best adapted to life in shallow coastal/swampy waters (such as Tiktaalik roseae). Thanks to relatively strong, muscular limbs (which were likely weight-bearing, thus making them a preferable alternative to traditional fins in extremely shallow water), and lungs which existed in conjunction with gills, Tiktaalik and animals like it were able to establish a strong foothold on land by the end of the Devonian period. In the Carboniferous, tetrapods (losing their gills) became fully terrestrialized, allowing their expansion into most terrestrial niches, though later on some will return to being aquatic and conquer the air also.

Terrestrial gastropods 

Gastropod mollusks are one of the most successful animals that have diversified in the fully terrestrial habitat. They have evolved terrestrial taxa in more than nine lineages. They are commonly referred to as land snails and slugs.

Terrestrial invasion of gastropod mollusks has occurred in Neritopsina, Cyclophoroidea, Littorinoidea, Rissooidea, Ellobioidea, Onchidioidea, Veronicelloidea, Succineoidea, and Stylommatophora, and in particular, each of Neritopsina, Rissooidea and Ellobioidea has likely achieved land invasion more than once.

Most terrestrialization events have occurred during the Paleozoic or Mesozoic. Gastropods are especially unique due to several fully terrestrial and epifaunal lineages that evolved during the Cenozoic. Some members of rissooidean families Truncatellidae, Assimineidae, and Pomatiopsidae are considered to have colonized to land during the Cenozoic. Most truncatellid and assimineid snails amphibiously live in intertidal and supratidal zones from brackish water to pelagic areas. Terrestrial lineages likely evolved from such ancestors. The rissooidean gastropod family Pomatiopsidae is one of the few groups that have evolved fully terrestrial taxa during the late Cenozoic in the Japanese Archipelago only. Shifts from aquatic to terrestrial life occurred at least twice within two Japanese endemic lineages in Japanese Pomatiopsidae and it started in the Late Miocene.

About one-third of gastropod species are terrestrial. In terrestrial habitats they are subjected to daily and seasonal variation in temperature and water availability. Their success in colonizing different habitats is due to physiological, behavioral, and morphological adaptations to water availability, as well as ionic and thermal balance. They are adapted to most of the habitats on Earth. The shell of a snail is constructed of calcium carbonate, but even in acidic soils one can find various species of shell-less slugs. Land-snails, such as Xerocrassa seetzeni and Sphincterochila boissieri, also live in deserts, where they must contend with heat and aridity. Terrestrial gastropods are primarily herbivores and only a few groups are carnivorous. Carnivorous gastropods usually feed on other gastropod species or on weak individuals of the same species; some feed on insect larvae or earthworms.

Semi-terrestrial animals 
Semi-terrestrial animals are macroscopic animals that rely on very moist environments to thrive, they may be considered a transitional point between true terrestrial animals and aquatic animals. Among vertebrates, amphibians have this characteristic relying on a moist environment and breathing through their moist skin while reproducing in water.

Many other animal groups solely have terrestrial animals that live like this: land planarians, land ribbon worms, roundworms (nematodes), and land annelids (clitellates) who are very primitive and breathe through skin.

Clitellates or terrestrial annelids demonstrate many unique terrestrial adaptations especially in their methods of reproduction, they tend towards being simpler than their marine relatives, the bristleworms, lacking many of the complex appendages the latter have.

Velvet worms are prone to desiccation not due to breathing through their skin but due to their spiracles being inefficient at protecting from desiccation, like clitellates they demonstrate extensive terrestrial adaptations and differences from their marine relatives including live birth.

Geoplankton 
Many animals live in terrestrial environments by thriving in transient often microscopic bodies of water and moisture, these include rotifers and gastrotrichs which lay resilient eggs capable of surviving years in dry environments, and some of which can go dormant themselves. Nematodes are usually microscopic with this lifestyle. Although eutardigrades only have lifespans of a few months, they famously can enter suspended animation during dry or hostile conditions and survive for decades, which allows them to be ubiquitous in terrestrial environments despite needing water to grow and reproduce. Many microscopic crustacean groups like copepods and amphipods and seed shrimps are known to go dormant when dry and live in transient bodies of water too.

See also 

 Aquatic animal
 Aquatic ecosystem
 Aquatic locomotion
 Aquatic mammal
 Aquatic plant
 Marine invertebrates
 Marine mammal
 Terrestrial 
 Terrestrial ecosystem
 Terrestrial locomotion
 Terrestrial plant
 
 Wetland indicator status
 Zoology

Further reading 
 Clack J. A. (2002). Gaining ground: the origin and evolution of tetrapods. Indiana University Press, 369 pp., .
 Cloudsley-Thompson J. L. (1988). Evolution and adaptation of terrestrial arthropods. Springer, 141 pp., .
 Dejours P. et al. (1987). Comparative physiology: life in water and on land. Liviana Editrice, Italy, 556 pp., .
 Gordon M. S. & Olson E. C. (1995). Invasions of the land: the transitions of organisms from aquatic to terrestrial life. Columbia University Press, 312 pp., .
 Little C. (1983). The colonisation of land: Origins and adaptations of terrestrial animals. Cambridge University Press, Cambridge. 290 pp., .
 Little C. (1990). The terrestrial invasion. An ecophysiological approach to the origin of land animals. Cambridge University Press, Cambridge. 304 pp. .

References 
This article incorporates CC-BY-2.0 text from the reference and CC-BY-2.5 text from the reference and CC-BY-3.0 text from the reference

Zoology
Terrestrial